Ardenville is an unincorporated area in Alberta, Canada.

Ardenville has the name of Arden Simpson, a pioneer citizen.

References 

Localities in the Municipal District of Willow Creek No. 26